"Apocalypse Please" is a song by English alternative rock band Muse, featured on their third studio album, Absolution (2003). A live version of the song was released as a download single on 23 August 2004, from which approximately 70% of all proceeds were donated to Oxfam. The song reached number ten on the first edition of the UK Official Download Chart, announced on 1 September 2004.

Background
"Apocalypse Please" was originally recorded with an orchestral backing, which was removed simply for being, according to Bellamy, "too much." Drummer Dominic Howard described the song as "a very theatrical song about religious fanatics and their wish that their prophecies come true [...] So that they can confirm their religion."

Producer Rich Costey said he wanted the toms on "Apocalypse Please" to sound as "ridiculous and as epic as possible". He had Howard play a pair of close-miked kick drums "to get a low, thumping sound".

Release
Along with the single release, Muse ran a competition to win a signed and framed set list, also in conjunction with Oxfam. In 2005, "Apocalypse Please" was featured on the live video album Absolution Tour; in 2008, it was also featured on the DVD edition of the live album HAARP.

Charts

References

External links
"Apocalypse Please" (audio) at the Muse official website
"Apocalypse Please" (Absolution Tour video) at the Muse official website
"Apocalypse Please" (HAARP video) at the Muse official website
"Apocalypse Please" lyrics at the Muse official website

Muse (band) songs
2004 singles
Songs written by Matt Bellamy
Song recordings produced by Rich Costey
2003 songs
East West Records singles
Songs written by Chris Wolstenholme
Songs written by Dominic Howard